The Codogno rail crash happened at Codogno, Italy, in the early evening of 9 December 1957. Fifteen people lost their lives, and at least 30 were seriously injured.

Description
The train then derailed and brought down a cast iron pylon.

The accident caused the deaths of fifteen people, including several truck drivers, and injured over thirty others.

References
Il Giornale del Mondo, anno, 1957 (nov-dic) ed. Cino del Duca, Historia, mensile illustrato n. 272 ottobre 1980

External links
www.bassolodigiano.it: Il disastro ferroviario del 1957 – collection of contemporary Italian newspaper articles about the crash

This article is based upon a translation of the Italian language version as at June 2012.

Derailments in Italy
Railway accidents in 1957
1957 in Italy
Lodi, Lombardy
Accidents and incidents involving Ferrovie dello Stato Italiane
Level crossing incidents in Italy